Hollywood/Highland station is an underground rapid transit (known locally as a subway) station on the B Line of the Los Angeles Metro Rail system. It is located under Hollywood Boulevard at its intersection with Highland Avenue, after which the station is named, in the Los Angeles neighborhood of Hollywood.

The station's entrance is located inside the Ovation Hollywood development which was built at about the same time as the station. The main entrances faces Hollywood Boulevard and is located in the center of the tourist area of Hollywood, near such attractions including the Dolby Theatre, El Capitan Theatre, TCL Chinese Theatre, Hollywood Museum and the Ripley's Believe It or Not! museum.

Location 
The station is in Hollywood on the corner of Hollywood Boulevard and Highland Avenue. Its entrance is inside the Ovation Hollywood shipping complex, on the Hollywood Boulevard side of the building. Pacific Electric Red Car interurban trains stopped on the surface in the early 1900s; this marked the junction of the Hollywood Line with the San Fernando Valley lines to Owensmouth and San Fernando.

The Ovation Hollywood is the home of the Dolby Theatre, which as been the venue of the annual Academy Awards ceremony since 2002. Due to security concerns, the Hollywood/Highland station is generally closed on the day of the ceremony.

Design and architecture 

The design of the station was created by three different firms. The designer of the station is Sheila Klein, and the constructor of the station is CannonDesign. The lighting, material and mechanical design are from HLB Lighting Design.

The construction of the station were to be made of equipments given by the Metro, which according to HLB, made it challenging. The lighting pillars of the station was to resemble like a flower, and it was carefully sized to match well with the smooth, curved ceiling which 'resembled a belly'. Sheila Klein named the architecture of the station, "Underground Girl".

Service

Station layout 
Hollywood/Highland is a two-story station; the top level is a mezzanine with ticket machines while the bottom is the platform level. The station uses a simple island platform with two tracks.

Hours and frequency

Connections 
, the following connections are available:
 Hollywood Bowl shuttle
 LADOT DASH: Hollywood; West Hollywood Cityline Commuter

Future K Line connection 

The under construction K Line will connect to this station via the future northern extension from the Expo/Crenshaw station (current terminus) which would offer connections to West Hollywood, Beverly Hills, Crenshaw District, Leimert Park, Miracle Mile, City of Inglewood, and LAX. It will also allow connections to the E Line, D Line, and C Line as well as the LAX Automated People Mover.

References 

 

B Line (Los Angeles Metro) stations
Buildings and structures in Hollywood, Los Angeles
Hollywood Boulevard
Railway stations in the United States opened in 2000
2000 establishments in California